Southwest Khasi Hills is an administrative district in the state of Meghalaya in India.

History 
The Southwest Khasi Hills district was carved out of the West Khasi Hills district on 3 August 2012.

Geography
The district headquarters is located at Mawkyrwat. The district occupies an area of 1,341 km². The district is compose all the villages of two Community & Rural Development Blocks viz. Ranikor and Mawkyrwat are Community & Rural Development Block, including 18 (Eighteen) Villages under Warsan Lyngdoh Gram Sevak Circle of Nongstoin in Community & Rural Development Block.

Administrative divisions
South West Khasi Hills district is divided into two blocks

References

External links
 Official website

 
Districts of Meghalaya
2012 establishments in Meghalaya
Autonomous regions of India